The 1910 Maine gubernatorial election took place on September 12, 1910.

Incumbent Republican Governor Bert M. Fernald was defeated for re-election by Democratic candidate Frederick W. Plaisted.

Plaisted was the first Democrat elected Governor of Maine since his father, Harris M. Plaisted, who won election as a Greenback-Democrat fusion candidate in 1880.

Results

Notes

References

Gubernatorial
1910
Maine
September 1910 events